San Ignacio United. is a Belizean football club it was founded and owned by: Primitivo Medina, Johnny Medina and Mark Medina in August 2011 and competed in the Belize first division under the Cayo Football Association.  The Club currently has 25 registered members consisting of players and the managing Staff, the players are a mixture of professional players from the Belize national selection and talented upcoming youths. The club is currently registered to play in the PLB(Premier League of Belize). The Premier League of Belize is the countries newest, biggest and only major league Football in Belize, and is played in a national level under The Belize Sport Council, Football Federation of Belize. and FIFA.

The team is based in San Ignacio.  Their home stadium is Norman Broaster Stadium.

Current squad

Old logo

External links
San Ignacio United

References

Football clubs in Belize
2011 establishments in Belize
San Ignacio, Belize
Association football clubs established in 2011